Keele Street is a north–south road in Toronto, Vaughan and King in Ontario, Canada. It stretches , running from Bloor Street in Toronto to the Holland Marsh. South of Bloor Street, the roadway is today known as Parkside Drive, but was originally part of Keele Street. It was renamed in 1921 by the City of Toronto.

Most of Keele Street runs directly along a former concession road (Third Line West of Yonge Street) allowance. Keele Street was named for local businessman and farmer William Conway Keele, who lived in what is West Toronto Junction or Lambton Mills area.

Route
Parkside Drive begins at Lake Shore Boulevard near Sunnyside Beach, site of the former Sunnyside Amusement Park. It runs north forming the eastern boundary to High Park until Bloor Street. To the east is the Roncesvalles neighbourhood.

North of Bloor Street, it becomes Keele Street. It runs through the residential High Park North neighbourhood and into the Junction, which contains a mix of residential and industrial areas around the railway tracks. It passes near the once important CPR West Toronto Yard. While Keele originally ran straight north, today there is a brief cut-off to deviate around the Canadian National and Canadian Pacific Railway corridors, near the former Canada Packers stock yards.

It resumes south of Eglinton Avenue, and connects with Weston Road by Rogers Road. There is a minor jog at Eglinton, via Trethewey Drive and Yore Road. The road servers major arteries for suburban neighbourhoods in York and North York such as Silverthorn, Amesbury, and Maple Leaf. North of Highway 401 it passes by Downsview Airport and forms the border between the residential neighbourhoods to the west and the large Keele-Finch industrial area to the east. Keele also forms the eastern border of York University.

At Steeles Avenue, the road allowance between the former North York and Vaughan Townships was connected in the early 1960s. North of Steeles, in Vaughan, Keele continues to pass through industrial areas. It runs to the west of the MacMillan Yard, Canada's largest rail yard. North of Rutherford Road, Keele Street is the main street for Maple, once a small town, but today a rapidly growing suburb. North of Maple, Keele Street passes through largely rural areas, but also serves as a major street for Hope and King City.

Intersections

Major streets in Toronto which intersect with Keele (south to north):

 Bloor Street
 Dundas Street
 St. Clair Avenue
 Eglinton Avenue
 Lawrence Avenue
 Wilson Avenue
 Sheppard Avenue
 Finch Avenue
 Steeles Avenue

Public transit

A portion of Keele was once a major streetcar route. The Toronto Suburban Railway ran streetcars along Keele from Dundas West to Weston Rd to connect to Lambton, Weston, and Woodbridge. The Toronto Transit Commission took over the Toronto Suburban Railway routes in the 1920s, and continued to run the northwestern streetcars on behalf of York Township. The streetcar lines were converted to buses in the late 1940s, and since then Keele has been served by buses.

Today Keele is served by the TTC 41 Keele bus route, which runs from Keele station, passing Keelesdale station, to Pioneer Village station via York University, and its counterpart night route, 341, serving almost the same route, but it terminates at York University station. There is also an express route operating during some periods, the 941 Keele express operating from Keele station to Finch West station. 

The TTC 107 York University heights operates from Finch West station to Canarctic Drive (just south of Steeles Avenue). North of Steeles Avenue, the York Region Transit 107 Keele runs from Pioneer Village station to Teston Road in Vaughan.

The Parkside Drive part of the street, which is formally Keele Street, is served by the TTC route 80 Queensway running south from Keele station to Lake Shore Blvd, then turning west to The Queensway.

It is also served on weekdays and Saturdays by the YRT 96 Keele-Yonge Route which runs north from Pioneer Village to King Road before turning right on King Road to go to Yonge Street which leads it to the Newmarket Terminal.

Landmarks

References

External links
Google Maps of Keele Street
North section
South of St. Clair Avenue

Roads in Toronto
Transport in King, Ontario
Transport in Vaughan